The Belgian State Railways Type 1 was a class of  steam locomotives for passenger service, introduced in 1864.

The locomotives were built by various Belgian manufacturers, with the exception of series of 9 machines, built in 1867 by Schneider-Creusot.

Construction history
The locomotives were built by various manufacturers from 1864 to 1883.
A Belpaire firebox was used and the boiler consisted of three boiler shells.
The machines had an outside frame with the cylinders and the Stephenson valve gear located inside the frame.

The design evolved over the years of construction.
While first series in 1864 was produced without shelter, a shelter was added in the following series in 1865–1866.
On the earlier series the suspension had simple balancing levers between the driving wheels. 
The machines built by Couillet and Schneider in 1867–1868 used a doorbell mechanism instead of the balancing lever to equalize the suspension forces between the two driving axles and on the last series in 1882 balancing levers between the leading axle and the first driver were used, combined with larger leaf springs on the rear driving axle.

Beginning with 1878 Westinghouse brakes were fitted. The locomotives also received new boilers and new shelters on major overhauls beginning with 1889.

Service history
From 1864 until 1890 the Type 1 was used on the main passenger trains on the major lines of the network, except for the line to Luxembourg.
With the advent of the Type 12 in 1888 the machines were deployed to secondary lines.
The last locomotives were withdrawn from  service in 1921–1926.

Notes

References

Bibliography

External links

 ETH-Bibliothek Zürich, Bildarchiv. Compagnie Belge (Evrard) No 196, Chemins de Fer de l‘Etat belge No 641 (1872), viewer

2-4-0 locomotives
Steam locomotives of Belgium
Standard gauge locomotives of Belgium